Oscar Ellis (3 May 1909 – 1 April 1987) was a Chilean footballer. He played in one match for the Chile national football team in 1941. He was also part of Chile's squad for the 1941 South American Championship.

References

External links
 

1909 births
1987 deaths
Chilean footballers
Chile international footballers
Place of birth missing
Association football defenders
Santiago Morning footballers